The list of ship commissionings in 1936 includes a chronological list of all ships commissioned in 1936.

References 

1936